Euphydryas asiatica is a small butterfly found in the Palearctic that belongs to the browns family.

Subspecies
E. a. asiatica Turkestan, Tarbagatai, Saur, Dzhungarsky Alatau
E. a. alexandrina (Staudinger, 1887) Tian-Shan
E. a. narina (Oberthür, 1909) Inner Tian-Shan]
Euphydryas asiatica narina  Korb & Bolshakov, 2011

References

Palearctic Lepidoptera
Butterflies described in 1881